Kyzyl-Adyr (formerly Kirovka) is a village in the Kara-Buura District of Talas Region of Kyrgyzstan. It is the seat of the Kara-Buura District. Its population was 13,612 in 2021. To the north is the Kirovskaya Reservoir. From the main east–west highway through Talas Region, one road goes north to Taraz in Kazakhstan and another goes south to Jalal-Abad Region over the Kara-Buura Pass to the Chatkal Valley (Jangy-Bazar and Kanysh-Kyya).

Population

References

Populated places in Talas Region